Mukō, Kyoto Prefecture held an election for the city assembly on August 5, 2007. 24 seats where contested by 25 candidates.

Results 

|-
! style="background-color:#E9E9E9;text-align:left;" |Parties
! style="background-color:#E9E9E9;text-align:right;" |Votes
! style="background-color:#E9E9E9;text-align:right;" |%
! style="background-color:#E9E9E9;text-align:right;" |Seats
|-
| style="text-align:left;" |Japanese Communist Party (日本共産党, Nihon Kyōsan-tō)
| style="text-align:right;" | 6,446
| style="text-align:right;" | 
| style="text-align:right;" | 8
|-
| style="text-align:left;" |New Komeito Party (公明党, Kōmeitō)
| style="text-align:right;" | 2,269
| style="text-align:right;" | 
| style="text-align:right;" | 3
|-
| style="text-align:left;" |Democratic Party of Japan (民主党, Minshutō)
| style="text-align:right;" | 2,428
| style="text-align:right;" | 
| style="text-align:right;" | 2
|-
| style="text-align:left;" |Liberal Democratic Party (自由民主党, Jiyū Minshutō)
| style="text-align:right;" | 1,151
| style="text-align:right;" | 
| style="text-align:right;" | 1
|-
| style="text-align:left;" |Social Democratic Party (社民党 Shamin-tō)
| style="text-align:right;" | 878
| style="text-align:right;" | 
| style="text-align:right;" | 1
|-
| style="text-align:left;" | Independents
| style="text-align:right;" | 7,527
| style="text-align:right;" | 
| style="text-align:right;" | 9
|-
|style="text-align:left;background-color:#E9E9E9"|Total (turnout 48.44 %)
|width="75" style="text-align:right;background-color:#E9E9E9"| 21,347
|width="30" style="text-align:right;background-color:#E9E9E9"| 100.00
|width="30" style="text-align:right;background-color:#E9E9E9"| 24
|-
| style="text-align:left;" colspan=4 |Source:go2senkyo
|}

References 

Mukō
2007 elections in Japan
August 2007 events in Japan